Robert "Bob" Graham (born October 7, 1947) is a Canadian retired professional ice hockey player and coach. He was selected by the New York Rangers in the first round (third overall) of the 1964 NHL Entry Draft, but never played in the National Hockey League.

Early life 
Graham was born in 1947 in Montreal, Quebec.

Career 
Graham began his professional career in 1968 with the Syracuse Blazers of the Eastern Hockey League (EHL). He played the 1968–69 season and part of the 1969–70 season in the EHL before moving on to the OHA Senior A Hockey League where he played until the 1973–74 season. He then continued his career in Europe where he both played and coached.

In the early-2000s, Graham served as an assistant coach at the University of Waterloo with the Waterloo Warriors (OUAA).

References

External links

1947 births
Living people
Anglophone Quebec people
Canadian ice hockey coaches
Canadian ice hockey centres
Charlotte Checkers (EHL) players
National Hockey League first-round draft picks
New York Rangers draft picks
Ottawa 67's players
Ice hockey people from Montreal
Syracuse Blazers players